Aurelus Louis "Relus" ter Beek (18 January 1944 – 29 September 2008) was a Dutch politician of the Labour Party (PvdA).

He served as a Member of the House of Representatives from 11 May 1971 until 7 November 1989 when he became Minister of Defence serving from 7 November 1989 until 22 August 1994 in the third Lubbers cabinet. He returned as a Member of the House of Representatives serving from 17 May 1994 until his resignation on 1 January 1995 to become the Queen's Commissioner of Drenthe, he served for thirteen years until his death on 29 September 2008 from lung cancer at the age of 64.

Decorations

References

External links

Official
  A.L. (Relus) ter Beek Parlement & Politiek

1944 births
2008 deaths
Commanders of the Order of Orange-Nassau
Deaths from lung cancer in the Netherlands
Dutch atheists
Dutch humanists
Dutch nonprofit directors
Dutch political activists
King's and Queen's Commissioners of Drenthe
Knights of the Order of the Netherlands Lion
Labour Party (Netherlands) politicians
Members of the House of Representatives (Netherlands)
Ministers of Defence of the Netherlands
People of the Bosnian War
University of Amsterdam alumni
People from Assen
People from Coevorden
20th-century Dutch politicians
21st-century Dutch politicians